DeLorme Publishing Company was a producer of personal satellite tracking, messaging, and navigation technology. In 2016, Garmin acquired the company's products and the DeLorme trademark. The company's main product, inReach, integrates GPS and satellite technologies. inReach provides the ability to send and receive text messages anywhere in the world (including when beyond cell phone range) by using the Iridium satellite constellation. By pairing with a smart phone, navigation is possible with access to free downloadable topographic maps and National Oceanic and Atmospheric Administration (NOAA) charts. On February 11, 2016, the company announced that it had been purchased by Garmin, a multinational producer of GPS products and services.

DeLorme also produces printed atlas and topographic software products. The company combines digital technologies with human editors to verify travel information and map details. DeLorme Atlas & Gazetteer is a complement to a vehicle’s GPS or online mapping site, allowing a traveller to browse and highlight the anticipated route and the possible activities or excursions along the way or at the destination. DeLorme’s Topo software is one of the sources of North American trail, logging road and terrain data for outdoor enthusiasts. Topo 10 has US and Canada topographic maps and elevation data with more than four million places of interest. Topo includes comprehensive park, lake, river and stream data for all 50 states. DeLorme continues to sell paper atlases, with more than 20 million copies sold to date.

Founded in 1976, DeLorme was headquartered in Yarmouth, Maine, and was home to Eartha, the world's largest revolving globe.

History 
The company was founded in 1976 by David DeLorme, who, being frustrated with obsolete back-country maps of the Moosehead Lake region of Maine, vowed to create a better map of Maine.

DeLorme combined state highway, county, and town maps as well as federal surveys to produce the Maine Atlas and Gazetteer which was printed in a large-format book with an initial printing of 10,000, which he marketed out of his car. The Gazetteer, which listed bicycle trails, canoeing and kayaking trips, and museum and historic sites, proved quite successful.

The company expanded to 75 employees in 1986, working from a Quonset hut in Freeport, Maine, producing maps for New England and upstate New York.

In 1987, the company produced a CD with detailed topographic map data of the entire world.

In 1991, DeLorme began vending Street Atlas USA on a single CD-ROM, becoming the most popular street-map CD in the United States, as well as one of the first mass consumer CD-ROM software products of any kind.

By 1995, DeLorme had 44 percent of the market share for CD maps. The same year the company partnered with the American Automobile Association (AAA) to produce the AAA Map 'n Go, the first mapping product to generate automatic routing. They also introduced the DeLorme GPS receiver to work with its maps.

In 1996, it introduced its maps into the PDA environment via Palm.

In 1997, the company relocated to a new corporate campus in Yarmouth, Maine, that features a giant model of the world, named Eartha, the largest rotating globe in the world. The company has provided complimentary geographic educational sessions for thousands of school children over the years and the public is welcome to visit and see Eartha from the three-story balconies.

In 1999, DeLorme introduced 3D TopoQuad DVD and CD products, which include digitized U.S. topographic maps.

In 2001, XMap professional GIS map program was produced on CD, and an expanded XMap was released in 2002, modified to provide GPS functionality to Palm OS and Pocket PC.

In 2004, DeLorme became the first company to sell a USB GPS device, the Earthmate GPS LT-20. At the same time, it began offering downloadable satellite and USGS 7.5-minute quads that could be overlaid on its maps using a new NetLink feature. Earlier models of Earthmate were among the first GPS receivers tethered to laptops.

In 2006/2007, the firm introduced its first full-featured GPS standalone receiver, the Earthmate GPS PN-20. During 2008, the company continued expanding its handheld GPS line with the Earthmate GPS PN-40 model. DeLorme also began selling OEM GPS modules allowing other manufacturers to add GPS to their products. In addition, the company began selling data to businesses.

In 2009, DeLorme released D.A.E. (Digital Atlas of the Earth). It is the first worldwide GPS accurate topographical map with a scale of 1 to 50,000. D.A.E. is the official world map for the US and Australian militaries.  It is a virtual globe of the earth that is almost 1,000 feet in diameter.

Acquisition 
On February 11, 2016, GPS products and services company Garmin announced it had agreed to purchase DeLorme. The announcement stated operations at DeLorme's Yarmouth facility would continue. Another announcement (March 3, 2016) confirmed the acquisition was complete.

See also 
 Maps of the United States
 Geospatial
 Trail maps

References

External links 
 DeLorme website
 LaptopGPSworld.com: Review of DeLorme Street Atlas 2008 
 inReach website
 Facebook: DeLormeGPS
 Twitter: DeLormeGPS

Map companies of the United States
Software companies based in Maine
Atlases
Cartography
GIS companies
GIS software
Global Positioning System
Navigation system companies
Route planning software
Companies based in Cumberland County, Maine
Yarmouth, Maine
American companies established in 1976
Publishing companies established in 1976
Software companies established in 1976
1976 establishments in Maine
2016 mergers and acquisitions
Garmin
Defunct software companies of the United States